"O'Lord" is a song by American contemporary Christian music singer and songwriter Lauren Daigle. It was released as the fifth single from her debut studio album, How Can It Be, on September 22, 2017.

Composition 

The ballad is played in an A♭ Major key at 172 beats per minute.

Commercial performance
The song became her eighth Hot Christian Songs Top 10, peaking at No. 3. It lasted 43 weeks on the overall chart. It also peaked at No. 1 on the Billboard Christian Airplay chart, her third No. 1 single from her 2014 EP How Can It Be.

Music video 

A music video for "O'Lord" was released on September 8, 2014, and has over 20 million views on YouTube. The video features Daigle singing with men in the background playing instruments. A lyric video for the single was released on October 24, 2017, following its radio release.

Charts

Weekly charts

Year-end charts

Certifications

References

2017 singles
2015 songs
Lauren Daigle songs